George Badke (February 11, 1946 – June 1, 2017) was an American football player and coach. He served as the head football coach at North Central College in Naperville, Illinois from 1979 to 1980, compiling a record of 12–6.  Badke was the head football coach at St. Laurence High School of Burbank, Illinois, Fenwick High School in Oak Park, Illinois, and Brother Rice High School in Chicago, Illinois.

Head coaching record

College

References

1946 births
2017 deaths
North Central Cardinals football coaches
High school football coaches in Illinois